Alexander Wilson (25 May 1953 – 26 October 1993) was a writer, teacher, landscape designer, and community activist.

Born in Ottawa, Illinois, Wilson grew up in Oakland, California. In 1977, he moved to Canada, where he lived and worked in Toronto, Ontario.

Wilson advocated restoring indigenous plant species to the urban landscape, thereby promoting urban biodiversity and reconnecting urban dwellers with the natural history of the place in which they live. He believed that combining ecological restoration and community gardening could be a way to nurture and improve not only urban ecosystems, but also social and economic relations. In his book, The Culture of Nature: North American Landscape from Disney to the Exxon Valdez (1991), he dealt with the ways in which culture informs and constructs our understanding of "nature", and he examined the colonisation and appropriation of nature by the city (particularly via the automobile).

Wilson established the Garrison Creek Planting Company with artist Stephen Andrews (his life partner) and horticulturist Kim Delaney. He also designed the landscaping for the AIDS Memorial, Cawthra Park, itself designed by Patrick Fahn. Following Wilson's death from AIDS-related causes, his own memorial plaque was added to the others in the park.

On an urban lot near his house Wilson created a reclaimed garden that, after his death, friends tried to buy and preserve. Though they were unsuccessful in that project they did find another downtown lot on which a garden was created and named in his memory, the Alex Wilson Community Garden, which opened in June 1998 at 552 Richmond Street West in Toronto.

A plaque in the park includes a quoted passage from The Culture of Nature:
"We must build landscapes that heal, connect and empower, that make intelligible our relations with each other and the natural world."

Bibliography
 The Culture of Nature: North American Landscape from Disney to the Exxon Valdez. Toronto: Between the Lines, 1991.

References
 Alex Wilson Community Garden. Accessed 26 April 2006.
 Anglo-American Name Authority File, s.v. "Wilson, Alexander, 1953-", LC Control Number nr 99031324. Accessed 26 April 2006.
 Bébout, Rick. Promiscuous Affections : A Life in The Bar, 1969-2000; "1993: June through (nearly) December". Accessed 26 April 2006.
 Canadian Lesbian & Gay Archives; Church & Wellesley: Photos. Accessed 28 April 2006.
 Davies, Ioan. Theorizing Toronto. Accessed 28 April 2006.
 Orsini, David. Remembering Alex Wilson. Accessed 27 January 2007. Originally appeared in Wildflower: North America's Magazine of Wild Flora, Autumn 1993.

Canadian gardeners
Canadian garden writers
Canadian community activists
Canadian horticulturists
Landscape or garden designers
American expatriates in Canada
1953 births
1993 deaths
Writers from Toronto
Urban theorists
Canadian gay writers
AIDS-related deaths in Canada
People from Ottawa, Illinois
20th-century Canadian botanists
20th-century Canadian LGBT people